(), known as  in Transylvania and  in Bukovina, are Romanian sweet pastries similar to filled doughnuts.  is the plural form of the Romanian word .

 are pieces of dough shaped into a flattened sphere that are deep-fried in oil and optionally dusted with icing sugar. They have a fluffy and airy consistency, no hole and are often filled.  fillings include chocolate, apricot jam, strawberry jam, cream cheese, or feta cheese.

See also

 List of doughnut varieties
 List of deep fried foods
 List of fried dough foods
 List of pastries

References

External links
 

Romanian pastries
Doughnuts
Stuffed desserts

ro:Gogoașă